Priceville may refer to

 Priceville, Ontario
 Priceville, Alabama
 Priceville, New Brunswick